Tortyra fulgens is a moth of the family Choreutidae. It was described by Cajetan Felder, Rudolf Felder and Alois Friedrich Rogenhofer in 1875 and is known from Colombia, Brazil and Bolivia.

The larvae bore in young twigs of Ficus species.

References

Tortyra
Taxa named by Alois Friedrich Rogenhofer
Moths described in 1875